Kasturba Gandhi college is an institute in west Marredpally of Secunderabad established in 1973.  It is named for Kasturba Gandhi It was established in 1973 by the Osmania Graduates' Association under the patronage of the Exhibition Society, it is still managed by the respective organisations.

External links
 

Universities and colleges in Hyderabad, India
Women's universities and colleges in Telangana
Memorials to Kasturba Gandhi
Educational institutions established in 1973
1973 establishments in Andhra Pradesh